Distichus is a genus of beetles in the family Carabidae, containing the following species:

 Distichus amazonicus Bänninger, 1933
 Distichus angustiformis (Chaudoir, 1880)
 Distichus becvari Dostal, 1999
 Distichus bisquadripunctatus Klug, 1862
 Distichus bolivianus Bänninger, 1933
 Distichus borneensis Bänninger, 1928
 Distichus dicaelus Chaudoir, 1880
 Distichus differens (Bänninger, 1956)
 Distichus ebeninus (Lynch Arribálzaga, 1878)
 Distichus evasus Bänninger, 1932
 Distichus gagatinus (Dejean, 1831)
 Distichus khalafi (H. A. Ali), 1967
 Distichus lacordairei (Dejean, 1831)
 Distichus laticeps Andrewes, 1929
 Distichus macleayi Andrewes, 1919
 Distichus mahratta (Andrewes, 1929)
 Distichus mediocris (Fairmaire, 1901)
 Distichus morio (Dejean, 1831)
 Distichus nevermanni (Bänninger, 1938)
 Distichus octocoelus (Chaudoir, 1855)
 Distichus orientalis (Bonelli, 1813)
 Distichus pachycerus Chaudoir, 1880
 Distichus parvus Wiedemann, 1823
 Distichus perrieri (Fairmaire, 1901)
 Distichus peruvianus (Dejean, 1831)
 Distichus picicornis Dejean, 1831
 Distichus planus Bonelli, 1813
 Distichus platyops Andrewes, 1932
 Distichus punctaticeps (Lynch Arribálzaga, 1878)
 Distichus puncticollis Chaudoir, 1855
 Distichus rectifrons H. W. Bates, 1892
 Distichus semicarinatus (Chaudoir, 1880)
 Distichus septentrionalis H. W. Bates, 1881
 Distichus smithi (Linell, 1898)
 Distichus striaticeps Chaudoir, 1880
 Distichus trivialis Chaudoir, 1880
 Distichus uncinatus Andrewes, 1923

References

Scaritinae